A list of notable Polish politicians of the Law and Justice Party.

A
 Andrzej Adamczyk
 Waldemar Andzel

B
 Małgorzata Bartyzel
 Ryszard Bender
 Adam Bielan
 Jerzy Bielecki
 Jacek Bogucki
 Anna Borucka-Cieślewicz
 Wojciech Borzuchowski
 Bogusław Bosak
 Joachim Brudziński
 Barbara Bubula
 Alfred Budner
 Mariusz Błaszczak

C
 Teresa Ceglecka-Zielonka
 Józef Cepil
 Zbigniew Chmielowiec
 Daniela Chrapkiewicz
 Aleksander Chłopek
 Edward Ciągło
 Piotr Cybulski
 Tadeusz Cymański
 Ryszard Czarnecki
 Witold Czarnecki
 Arkadiusz Czartoryski
 Roman Czepe
 Edward Czesak

D
 Andrzej Mikołaj Dera
 Andrzej Diakonow
 Zbigniew Dolata
 Ludwik Dorn
 Marzenna Drab
 Tomasz Dudziński
 Lena Dąbkowska-Cichocka

F
 Jacek Falfus
 Janina Fetlińska
 Hanna Foltyn-Kubicka
 Józef Fortuna
 Anna Fotyga

G
 Karolina Gajewska
 Zyta Gilowska
 Zbigniew Girzyński
 Szymon Giżyński
 Adam Glapiński
 Mieczysław Golba
 Marian Goliński
 Małgorzata Gosiewska
 Jerzy Gosiewski
 Przemysław Gosiewski
 Kazimierz Gołojuch
 Marek Gróbarczyk
 Artur Górski
 Tomasz Górski
 Grażyna Gęsicka

H
 Kazimierz Hajda
 Czesław Hoc
 Zbigniew Hoffmann
 Adam Hofman

J
 Michał Jach
 Dawid Jackiewicz
 Jarosław Jagiełło
 Elżbieta Jakubiak
 Grzegorz Janik
 Mieczysław Janowski
 Wojciech Jasiński
 Kazimierz Jaworski
 Marek Jurek
 Krzysztof Jurgiel
 Jędrzej Jędrych

K
 Janusz Kaczmarek
 Filip Kaczyński
 Jarosław Kaczyński
 Lech Kaczyński
 Ryszard Kaczyński
 Mariusz Kamiński
 Michał Kamiński
 Lucjan Karasiewicz
 Stanisław Karczewski
 Karol Karski
 Jan Józef Kasprzyk
 Beata Kempa
 Wiesław Kilian
 Izabela Kloc
 Joanna Kluzik-Rostkowska
 Stanisław Kogut
 Andrzej Kosztowniak
 Paweł Kowal
 Henryk Kowalczyk
 Bogusław Kowalski
 Zbigniew Kozak
 Lech Kołakowski
 Robert Kołakowski
 Jacek Kościelniak
 Maks Kraczkowski
 Leonard Krasulski
 Elżbieta Kruk
 Urszula Krupa
 Piotr Krzywicki
 Marek Kuchciński
 Anna Kurska
 Jacek Kurski
 Zbigniew Kuźmiuk
 Sławomir Kłosowski

L
 Jarosław Lasecki
 Tomasz Latos
 Ryszard Legutko
 Jan Filip Libicki
 Marcin Libicki
 Krzysztof Lipiec
 Adam Lipiński
 Andrzej Liss
 Alojzy Lysko

M
 Krzysztof Maciejewski
 Antoni Macierewicz
 Tadeusz Madziarczyk
 Ewa Malik
 Kazimierz Marcinkiewicz
 Barbara Marianowska
 Tomasz Markowski
 Gabriela Masłowska
 Mirosława Masłowska
 Jerzy Materna
 Marek Matuszewski
 Kazimierz Matuszny
 Beata Mazurek
 Andrzej Mańka
 Tomasz Merta
 Krzysztof Michałkiewicz
 Hanna Mierzejewska
 Marek Migalski
 Krzysztof Mikuła
 Mirosław Milewski
 Wojciech Mojzesowicz
 Halina Molka
 Kazimierz Moskal
 Arkadiusz Mularczyk
 Marek Muszyński
 Antoni Mężydło
 Henryk Młynarczyk

N
 Aleksandra Natalli-Świat
 Szymon Niemiec
 Maria Nowak
 Ryszard Nowak

O
 Stanisława Okularczyk
 Halina Olendzka
 Dariusz Olszewski
 Marek Opioła
 Jan Ołdakowski

P
 Anna Pakuła-Sacharczuk
 Anna Paluch
 Stefan Pastuszewski
 Bolesław Piecha
 Mirosław Piotrowski
 Stanisław Pięta
 Marian Piłka
 Jerzy Polaczek
 Marek Polak
 Paweł Poncyljusz
 Tomasz Poręba
 Andrzej Pruszkowski
 Bernard Ptak
 Krzysztof Putra
 Adam Puza
 Maciej Płażyński

R
 Elżbieta Rafalska
 Józef Ramlau
 Zbigniew Religa
 Adam Rogacki
 Józef Rogacki
 Nelli Rokita
 Giovanni Roman
 Zbigniew Romaszewski
 Wojciech Roszkowski
 Andrzej Ruciński
 Jarosław Rusiecki
 Monika Ryniak
 Erwina Ryś-Ferens

S
 Małgorzata Sadurska
 Jacek Sauk
 Grzegorz Schreiber
 Dariusz Seliga
 Jarosław Sellin
 Michał Seweryński
 Edward Siarka
 Radosław Sikorski
 Anna Sobecka
 Andrzej Sośnierz
 Jarosław Stawiarski
 Małgorzata Stryjska
 Marek Surmacz
 Marek Suski
 Wojciech Szarama
 Aleksander Szczygło
 Jolanta Szczypińska
 Andrzej Szlachta
 Bartłomiej Szrajber
 Stanisław Szwed
 Beata Szydło
 Konrad Szymański
 Jan Szyszko

T
 Krzysztof Tchórzewski
 Ryszard Terlecki
 Grzegorz Tobiszowski

U
 Kazimierz Michał Ujazdowski

W
 Mieczysław Walkiewicz
 Andrzej Walkowiak
 Zbigniew Wassermann
 Ryszard Wawryniewicz
 Tadeusz Wita
 Elżbieta Witek
 Waldemar Wiązowski
 Elżbieta Więcławska-Sauk
 Jadwiga Wiśniewska
 Lucyna Wiśniewska
 Michał Wojtkiewicz
 Piotr Woźniak
 Marzena Wróbel
 Paweł Wypych

Z
 Stanisław Zadora
 Stanisław Zając
 Paweł Zalewski
 Artur Zawisza
 Sławomir Zawiślak
 Łukasz Zbonikowski
 Jarosław Zieliński
 Zbigniew Ziobro
 Maria Zuba
 Jan Zubowski
 Kosma Złotowski

Ć
 Andrzej Ćwierz

Ł
 Marek Łatas

Ż
 Jarosław Żaczek
 Zbigniew Ziobro
 Wojciech Żukowski

 
Law and Justice